Larisa Neiland and Brenda Schultz-McCarthy were the defending champions but only Neiland competed that year with Ruxandra Dragomir.

Dragomir and Neiland lost in the quarterfinals to Eva Melicharová and Helena Vildová.

Melicharová and Vildová won in the final 6–3, 7–6(8–6) against Karina Habšudová and Florencia Labat.

Seeds
Champion seeds are indicated in bold text while text in italics indicates the round in which those seeds were eliminated.

 Ruxandra Dragomir /  Larisa Neiland (quarterfinals)
 Sabine Appelmans /  Miriam Oremans (first round)
 Kristie Boogert /  Linda Wild (semifinals)
 Anke Huber /  Mary Pierce (semifinals)

Draw

External links
 1997 Heineken Trophy Women's Doubles Draw
 Main draw (WTA)

Women's Doubles
Doubles